Robert Gerhard's Hymnody is a contemporary classical work from 1963, which was an assignment from BBC. This piece was written during February and March of that year.

Composer notes 
A note from the composer:  First citation comes from Psalm 22, vers 12: "... Cashan's strong bulls messed me up;" the second one from Psalm 88, vers 12: "will your wonders be known in the dark?"

Orchestration and instruments 
This work was written in nine strongly contrasted sections, played without a break.

Orchestration: flute, oboe, clarinet, horn, trumpet, trombone, tuba, percussion, vibraphone, Korean temple block, 3 Chinese toms, clave, timp, xylorimb, bonbo, tamb, xylophone.

Premiere and criticism 
Hymnody, a BBC assignment, was written in  February and March 1963, and was premiered on "Thursday Invitation Concert" on May 23 the same year, by members of the "London Virtuoso Ensemble", directed by Jacques-Louis Monod.

References 

Chamber music compositions
1963 works
Compositions by Robert Gerhard